East Perth Gas Works was built in 1922 for the Perth City Council to produce town gas from coal, supplying the city of Perth in Western Australia.  It could initially supply  of gas per day.

It was built on the site of the earlier 1886 Perth Gas Company plant.

The works was situated on the north bank of Claise Brook and operated until its decommissioning in 1971.  It was dismantled over a number of years, and the landmark 20-sided gasometer known as the "No. 2 Cityholder" was removed in 1985.

As a result of the processes in its operation, land surrounding the works was badly contaminated with polycyclic aromatic hydrocarbons (PAHs). From the mid-1980s, a major environmental remediation project on behalf of the State Energy Commission of Western Australia, which owned the land, was undertaken to remove the contaminated soils created by the works.

References

East Perth, Western Australia
Oil and gas companies of Australia